Belmont Park (also called Belmont Pleasure Grounds) is a public park in Exeter, England. Opened to the public in 1886 as a children's play area, it was subsequently enlarged for the use of the general public.

Location
The park is bounded by Belmont Road, Blackboy Road, Gordon Road, Jesmond Road, Grosvener Place and Clifton Hill and is in close proximity to Clifton Hill Sports Centre and Clifton Hill Driving Range.

Features

The Newtown Community Association, the Exeter Scrapstore and the Belmont Bowling Club are all located at the park. There is an area for soccer practice or other "kick about" activity, and an area dedicated to half court basketball. Seating is provided and open spaces are available for picnics. There is a large dog-free zone with equipment for younger and older children.

A sensory garden intended especially for the blind is situated at the eastern corner of the park.  This aspect of the park was created in 1939 and restored in 2007.

References

External links
 Exeter City Council article on Belmont Park

Exeter
Parks and open spaces in Devon
Blindness
Tourist attractions in Exeter